Gundiyat Gaon is a village located in the Rawain valley, in the foothills of the Himalaya, Uttarakhand, India.

Gundiyat Gaon is the largest of the valley villages.

There is a local deity temple in the middle of village. The temple has the idol of Kapil Muni Maharaj, Khandasuri Dev and Kali Mayya. The architecture of temple is an example of fine art of ancient time. The walls of the temple is made of large rectangular blocks of fine and rare stone. Each block has engravings on it, showing drawings of gods and various designs. There is also temple of Shiva, Kamleshwar, nearby the village. The temple has an ancient linga of Lord Shiva. People from far places come to visit the place in large number.

Gundiyat Goun is named after स्वर्गीय Shri Gundi Prasad  Nautiyal .

References

Villages in Uttarkashi district